George C. Hadjipanayis is a Greek physicist.

Hadjipanayis completed his Bachelor of Science degree in physics at the University of Athens in 1969. He then moved to Canada to pursue further study in the subject, and obtained a Master of Science in 1974, followed by a doctorate in 1979, both from the University of Manitoba. Hadjipanayis teaches at the University of Delaware. In 2001, he was elected a fellow of the American Physical Society, "f[or]" his innovative and applicable investigations and development of novel permanent magnets and magnetic nanoparticles.

References

Greek expatriates in Canada
20th-century Greek physicists
University of Delaware faculty
Fellows of the American Physical Society
21st-century Greek physicists
University of Manitoba alumni
Living people
Greek expatriates in the United States
National and Kapodistrian University of Athens alumni
Year of birth missing (living people)